A list of films produced by the Bollywood film industry based in Mumbai in the 1990s:

1990
 Maine Pyar kiya 1990 Salman khan Bhagyashree debut film romantic

1991

1992

1993

1994

1995

1996

1997

1998

1999

See also
 Bollywood
 List of highest-grossing Bollywood films
 List of highest-grossing Bollywood films in overseas markets
 :Category:Lists of Bollywood films by year

1990s
Lists of 1990s films
Bollywood